Fairhope is an unincorporated community and census-designated place in Washington Township, Fayette County, Pennsylvania, United States. It is in the northwestern corner of Fayette County, bordered by Lynwood to the northwest, Naomi to the west, and Arnold City to the east. Pennsylvania Route 201 passes through Fairhope, leading north to Interstate 70 and south to Fayette City. As of the 2010 census, the population of Fairhope was 1,151.

Demographics

References

External links

Census-designated places in Fayette County, Pennsylvania
Census-designated places in Pennsylvania